Oyin Oladejo (born  in Ibadan, Nigeria) is a Nigerian-born Canadian actress, known for portraying Joann Owosekun on the television series Star Trek: Discovery.

Life 
Oladejo was born in Ibadan, Nigeria, and grew up in Lagos. She moved to Canada in 2001 at the age of 16. She originally planned to study law, rejected it, and got a job as a ticket seller for the Canadian Opera Company, where she discovered her interest in acting.  She then completed a course of study in theatre arts at Humber College in Toronto, and the Soul Pepper Academy in Toronto. In addition to regular theater engagements in Toronto, she played a supporting role in a short film, but otherwise had no film offers; according to her own statement in an interview, she was about to give up the acting profession. Finally, she took on the advice of her agent with a self-made video of a casting part, without knowing what production it was for, and was shortly thereafter selected for the role of bridge officer Joann Owosekun on Star Trek: Discovery. Oladejo has appeared in the series since the first season of the series.

In the following years she was seen in the role of Ophelia in William Shakespeare's Hamlet and in the male role of Lopakhin in Anton Chekhov's The Cherry Orchard.

Theater (selection) 
 In This World, Roseneath Theatre, Toronto 2013
 Happy Place, Soulpepper (Young Centre for the Performing Arts), Toronto 2015
 Marat/Sade, Soulpepper (Young Centre for the Performing Arts), Toronto 2015
 Noises Off, Soulpepper (Young Centre for the Performing Arts), Toronto 2016
 A Doll's House, Soul pepper (Young Centre for the Performing Arts), Toronto 2016
 TomorrowLove, Outside the March, Toronto 2016
 Hamlet, Shakespeare Theatre Company, Washington, D.C. 2018
 The Cherry Orchard, Crown's Theatre, Toronto 2019 (as Lopakhin)
 The Father (Florian Zeller), Coal Mine Theatre, Toronto 2019

Filmography 
 2017: Pond (short film by Tochi Osuji)
 2017–present: Star Trek: Discovery (TV Series)
 2020: Endlings (TV Series)
2021: Six Guns for Hire (Film)

Awards 
 Edna Khubyar Acting Award (Humber College)
 Dora Mavor Moore Award for Outstanding Performance – Individual (for In This World)

References

External links 
 

Living people
1985 births
Canadian television actresses
Canadian stage actresses
Actresses from Ibadan
Actresses from Lagos
Actresses from Toronto
21st-century Canadian actresses
21st-century Nigerian actresses
Humber College alumni
Nigerian emigrants to Canada
Nigerian stage actresses
Nigerian television actresses
Black Canadian actresses